Pyrylium is a cation (positive ion) with formula , consisting of a six-membered ring of five carbon atoms, each with one hydrogen atom, and one positively charged oxygen atom. The bonds in the ring are conjugated as in benzene, giving it an aromatic character. In particular, because of the positive charge, the oxygen atom is trivalent.  Pyrilium is a mono-cyclic and heterocyclic compound, one of the oxonium ions.

Salts
Pyrylium and its derivatives form stable salts with a variety of anions.

Derivatives
Many important cations are formally derived from pyrylium by substitution of various functional groups for some or all the hydrogens in the ring.  The 2,4,6-triphenylpyrilium, referred to as the Katritzky salt, (after Alan R. Katritzky) is an important example used in many modern examples of metal catalyzed cross-couplings.

Chemical properties
Like other oxonium ions, pyrylium is unstable in neutral water. However, pyrylium is much less reactive than ordinary oxonium ions because of aromatic stabilization. The 2,4,6-triphenyl salt is commonly reacted with aliphatic amines at the 1 position, forming pyridinium salts and activating them towards oxidative addition by metal complexes, most notably ones with nickel. Pyrylium cations also react with nucleophiles in the 2, 4, and 6 positions, which can induce a variety of reactions. The high electronegativity of the oxygen results in strong single perturbation by one heteroatom in the six-membered ring.

Synthesis
Pyrylium salts are easily produced from simple starting materials through a condensation reaction.

Pyrylium salts with aromatic substituents, such 2,4,6-triphenylpyrylium tetrafluoroborate, can be obtained from two moles of acetophenone and one mole of benzaldehyde in the presence of tetrafluoroboric acid and an oxidizing agent (Dilthey synthesis). For pyrylium salts with alkyl substituents, such as 2,4,6-trimethylpyrylium salts, the best method uses the Balaban-Nenitzescu-Praill synthesis from tertiary butanol and acetic anhydride in the presence of tetrafluoroboric, perchloric, or trifluoromethanesulfonic acids. 2,4,6-Triphenylpyrylium salts are converted by bases into a stable 1,5-enedione (pseudobase), but 2,4,6-trimethylpyrylium salts on treatment with hot alkali hydroxides afford an unstable pseudobase that undergoes an intramolecular condensation yielding 3,5-dimethylphenol. In warm deuterium oxide, 2,4,6-trimethylpyrylium salts undergo isotopic exchange of 4-methyl hydrogens faster than for the 2- and 6-methyl groups, allowing the synthesis of regioselectively deuterated compounds.

Derivatives
The reactivity of pyrylium salts toward nucleophiles makes them useful materials for producing other compounds with stronger aromatic character. Pyrylium salts afford pyridines with ammonia, pyridinium salts with primary amines, pyridine-N-oxides with hydroxylamine, phosphabenzenes with phosphine derivatives, thiopyrylium salts with hydrogen sulfide, and benzene derivatives with acetonitrile or nitromethane.

Pyrones

A pyrylium cation with a hydroxyl anion substituent in the 2-position is not the zwitterionic aromatic compound (1), but the neutral unsaturated lactone 2-pyrone or pyran-2-one (2). Important representatives of this class are the coumarins. Likewise a 4-hydroxyl pyrylium compound is a γ-pyrone or pyran-4-one (4), to which group belong compounds such as maltol.

Chemical properties

2-Pyrones are known to react with alkynes in a Diels–Alder reaction to form arene compounds with expulsion of carbon dioxide, for example:

Polycyclic pyrylium ions

Chromenylium ion
One bicyclic pyrylium ion is called benzopyrylium ion (IUPAC: chromenylium ion) (formula: , molar mass: 131.15 g/mol, exact mass: 131.04968983). It can be seen as a charged derivative of 2H-1-benzopyran (IUPAC: 2H-chromene), or a (charged) substituted heterocyclic derivative of naphthalene.

Flavylium ion
In biology, the 2-phenylbenzopyrylium  (2-phenylchromenylium) ion is referred to as flavylium. A class of flavylium-derived compounds are anthocyanidins and anthocyanins, pigments that are responsible for the colors of many flowers.

Naphthoxanthenium cation
Higher polycyclic derivatives of pyrylium also exist. One good example is naphthoxanthenium. This dye is highly stable, aromatic, and planar. It absorbs in the UV and blue region and presents exceptional photophysical properties. It can be synthesized by chemical or photochemical reactions.

See also
 6-membered aromatic rings with one carbon replaced by another group: borabenzene, silabenzene, germabenzene, stannabenzene, pyridine, phosphorine, arsabenzene, stibabenzene, bismabenzene, pyrylium, thiopyrylium, selenopyrylium, telluropyrylium
Pyran,  (pyrones lacking the ketone group)

References

Oxygen heterocycles
Six-membered rings